John Alexander Bruce (11 November 1887 – 20 October 1970) was a New Zealand rugby union player and cricketer.

Rugby union
A loose forward, Bruce represented Wellington and Auckland at a provincial level, and was a member of the New Zealand national side, the All Blacks, in 1913 and 1914. He played 10 matches for the All Blacks including two internationals. At the end of World War I, Bruce played for the New Zealand Services team in Britain and South Africa.

Cricket
Bruce was a middle-order batsmen who made his first-class debut for Wellington in the 1907/08 season. In all, he played eight first-class matches for Wellington between 1907 and 1923, with an hiatus of almost 12 years between appearances in 1909 and 1921. He scored 325 runs at an average of 32.50, and a high score of 107.

References

1887 births
1970 deaths
Rugby union players from Wellington City
Cricketers from Wellington City
New Zealand rugby union players
New Zealand international rugby union players
Wellington rugby union players
Auckland rugby union players
Rugby union flankers
New Zealand cricketers
Wellington cricketers
New Zealand military personnel of World War I